City Lights is a 1931 film starring Charlie Chaplin.

City Lights may also refer to:

Music
 City Lights (band), an easycore band from Columbus, Ohio
 City Lights (Lee Morgan album), 1957
 City Lights, 1975 album by Mickey Gilley
 City Lights (Dr. John album), 1978
 City Lights (Lou Reed album), 1985
 City Lights (Json album), 2010
 City Lights (Jimmy McGriff album)
 City Lights (EP), a 2019 extended play by Baekhyun
 City Lights: Country Favorites, a 1972 album by Connie Smith
 "City Lights" (Ray Price song), 1958
 "City Lights" (Blanche song), 2017
 "City Lights" (Tim McGraw song), 2014
 "City Lights", a 1976 song by David Essex
 "City Lights", a song from the 1977 musical The Act
 "City Lights", a 2004 song by JoJo from JoJo
 "City Lights", a 2009 song by Method Man
 "City Lights", a 2010 song by Motionless in White from Creatures
 "City Lights", a 2012 song by Bridgit Mendler
 "City Lights", a 2015 song by Avicii from Stories
 "City Lights", a 2016 song by The White Stripes from the Jack White compilation Acoustic Recordings 1998–2016

Film and television
City Lights (1973 TV series), a Canadian celebrity interview series
City Lights (1984 TV series), a Scottish sitcom made by BBC Scotland
City Lights (2007 TV series), a 2007 British comedy-drama, the sequel to Northern Lights
CityLights (2014 film), a Hindi-language film directed by Hansal Mehta

Other fields
City Lights Bookstore, a landmark independent bookstore and a small press publisher
Seattle City Light, the public utility in the Seattle metropolitan area
Front position lamps, also called city lights

See also
City of Light (disambiguation)
Lichter der Stadt, a 2012 album by Unheilig
 Street light